A boy is a human male child or young man.

Boy or The Boy may also refer to:

People
 Boy (name), a list of people with the given name, nickname or stage name

Arts and entertainment

Fictional characters
 Boy (comics), in the comic book The Invisibles
 "Boy", the adopted son of Tarzan in some film adaptations of Tarzan
 Boy, a lion featured in the 1966 film Born Free
 Boy, the main antagonist of the 1989 film Little Monsters
 The Boy, Eustace Boyce, a character in the webcomic Scary Go Round

Films
 Boy (1969 film) (Shōnen), a Japanese film
 Boys (2003 film), a Tamil film directed by S. Shankar
 Boy (2009 film), a Filipino film directed by Auraeus Solito
 Boy (2010 film), a New Zealand film directed by Taika Waititi
 The Boy (2015 film), an American psychological horror film directed by Craig Macneill
 The Boy (2016 film), an American horror film directed by William Brent Bell

Books 
 Boy (book), a 1984 autobiography by Roald Dahl
 Boy (novel), a 1931 novel by James Hanley
 Boy, a 1900 novel by Marie Corelli
 Boy, a Spanish language novel by Luis Coloma
 The Beautiful Boy, published in the UK as The Boy, a 2003 book by Germaine Greer
The Boy (Malte novel), a 2016 French novel by Marcus Malte, translated in 2019 by Emma Ramadan and Tom Roberge

Music

Groups
 Boy (American band), an American rock group that included Freddy Moore of The Nu Kats
 Boy (Canadian band), a Canadian indie pop group
 Boy (duo), a Swiss-German pop duo founded 2007
 B.O.Y, a South Korean pop duo founded 2019

Albums
 Boy (U2 album), 1980
 Boy (Lena Philipsson album), 1987

Songs
 "Boy" (Book of Love song), 1985
 "Boy" (Emma Louise song), 2012
 "Boy" (Erasure song), 2006
 "Boy" (Lee Brice song), 2017
 "Boy" (Marcella Detroit song), 1996
 "Boy" (Shion Miyawaki song), 2007
 "Boy (I Need You)", by Mariah Carey, 2002
 "Boy", by Charlie Puth from Voicenotes, 2018
 "Boy", by Chaz Jankel from Chasanova, 1981
 "Boy", by Hellyeah from Welcome Home, 2019
 "Boy", by the Killers, 2022
 "Boy", by Kylie Minogue, a B-side of "Can't Get You Out of My Head", 2001
 "Boy", by Little Mix from Salute, 2013
 "Boy", by Maisie Peters from You Signed Up for This, 2021
 "Boy", by Odesza from A Moment Apart, 2017
 "Boy", by Ra Ra Riot from The Orchard, 2010
 "Boy", by Treasure from The First Step: Chapter One, 2020
 "Boy (Go)", by the Golden Palominos from Visions of Excess, 1985
 "Boy (I'm So in Love with You)", by Robin Zander from Robin Zander, 1993
 "B.O.Y.", by Jessica Simpson from A Public Affair, 2006
 "The Boy", by Alabama from Roll On, 1984
 "The Boy", by Casey Veggies, 2014 
 "The Boy", by Samantha Mumba from Gotta Tell You, 2000

Other arts and entertainment
 Boy (play), a 2016 play by Leo Butler
 The Boy (Modigliani), a 1919 painting by Amedeo Modigliani
 The Boy (musical), a 1917 London hit musical comedy
 The Boy (TV series), a Canadian animated television series

Other uses 
 Boy seaman, a rating in the British Royal Navy and enlisted rank in the United States Navy
 Boy (dog), a 17th-century hunting poodle owned by Prince Rupert of the Rhine
 Boy, a part of the borough of Bottrop-Süd in Bottrop, North Rhine-Westphalia, Germany
 Son

See also 

 Little Boy
 
 
 
 
 Boi (disambiguation)
 Bouy (disambiguation)
 "Boy, Boy, Boy", a 2007 song by Underworld off the album Oblivion with Bells
 Boyboy (disambiguation)
 Boye (disambiguation)
 Boys (disambiguation)
 Buoy (disambiguation)
 Oh Boy (disambiguation)
 "This Boy", a 1963 song by the Beatles